The Eungella tinker frog (Taudactylus liemi), also known as Eungella tinkerfrog, Liem's frog, or Liem's tinker frog, is a species of frog in the family Myobatrachidae. It is endemic to the Eungella area in Queensland, Australia. It is commonly heard but rarely seen. In contrast to other amphibians in the area, such as Taudactylus eungellensis, no adverse effects of the chytrid fungus Batrachochytrium dendrobatidis have been reported on this species. It is currently facing no major threats, although its habitat could be impacted by grazing and trampling of streamside vegetation by livestock. Also invasive cane toads (Rhinella marina) are a potential future threat. Its range is with the Eungella National Park.

References

Taudactylus
Frogs of Australia
Endemic fauna of Australia
Amphibians of Queensland
Amphibians described in 1980
Taxa named by Glen Joseph Ingram
Taxonomy articles created by Polbot